P. juncea may refer to:

 Patersonia juncea, a purple flag
 Platysace juncea, a perennial plant
 Pocadicnemis juncea, a sheet weaver
 Prenanthes juncea, a plant with fascicled stems
 Psathyrostachys juncea, a grass native to Russia and China